Emilia Galotti is a play in five acts by Gotthold Ephraim Lessing (1729–1781), which premiered on 8 March 1772 in Brunswick ("Braunschweig" in German). The work is a classic example of German bürgerliches Trauerspiel (bourgeois tragedy). Other works in this category include Schiller's Kabale und Liebe and Hebbel's Maria Magdalene. The story is based upon the Roman myth of Verginia.

Emilia Galotti is a drama of the Enlightenment, though it doesn't precisely follow the standard French model of the era. Although love is a central theme, in reality Emilia Galotti is primarily a political commentary. The arbitrary style of rule by the aristocracy is placed in stark contrast to the new and enlightened morality of the bourgeoisie. The more feudal ideas of love and marriage thus come into conflict with the growing tendency to marry for love, rather than family tradition and power. This combination results in a rather explosive situation. It was made into a film in 1958.

Characters
 Emilia Galotti
 Odoardo Galotti, father of Emilia Galotti
 Claudia Galotti, mother of Emilia Galotti
 Pirro, servant of the Galottis
 Hettore Gonzaga, prince of Guastalla
 Marinelli, chamberlain of the prince
 Camillo Rota, one of the prince's advisors
 Conti, a painter
 Count Appiani
 Countess Orsina
 Angelo, a robber
 Battista, servant of Gonzaga

Plot
Set in Italy , Emilia Galotti tells the story of a virtuous young woman of the bourgeoisie. The absolutist prince of Guastalla, Hettore Gonzaga, becomes obsessed with the idea of making Emilia his lover after their first meeting. He thus gives his conniving Chamberlain, Marinelli, the right to do anything in his power to delay the previously arranged marriage between Emilia and Count Appiani. Marinelli then hires criminals who shortly thereafter murder the count on his way to the wedding. Emilia is quickly brought to safety in the prince's nearby summer residence. Unlike her mother Claudia, Emilia does not yet recognise the true implications of the scheme. A few moments later, Countess Orsina, the prince's former mistress, comes to the residence as well. Out of frustration over her harsh rejection by the prince, she attempts to convince Odoardo, Emilia's father, to avenge Count Appiani by stabbing the prince to death. Odoardo, however, hesitates in agreeing to this proposal and decides to leave the revenge in the hands of God. Emilia, who must remain under the protection of the prince due to another intrigue on Marinelli's behalf, attempts to convince her father to kill her in order to maintain her dignity in light of the prince's exertions to seduce her. The father agrees and stabs her, but immediately feels appalled by his deed. In the end Odoardo leaves the matter to the prince. He subsequently decides that Marinelli is responsible for the catastrophe and has him banned from his court. Ultimately, Emilia's father recognises God as the absolute authority.

Theme
Lessing's work of course comprises an attack against the nobility and its powers. Lessing depicts aristocrats as having unfair powers in society and as ruining the happiness of the emerging middle class. With the play, Lessing directs criticism at the tyranny of the reigning class.

Criticism
Music historian Charles Burney, arriving in Vienna in 1772, attended a performance of Emilia Galotti. "I should suppose this play to have been well acted; there were energy and passion, and many speeches were much applauded." But the Englishman was surprised by the "impious oaths and execrations" of the script: "The interlocutors curse, swear, and call names, in a gross and outrageous manner. I know not, perhaps, the exact ideas annexed by the Germans to the following expressions, of "Mein Gott," "Gott verdamm ihn," etc., but they shocked my ears very frequently." Still, Burney was impressed by the piece: "There is an original wildness in the conduct and sentiments of this piece which renders it very interesting."

In Arthur Schopenhauer's The Art of Literature, he criticised Emilia Galotti as a play with a "positively revolting" end.

In literature
Johann Wolfgang von Goethe refers to Emilia Galotti in his novel The Sorrows of Young Werther (Die Leiden des jungen Werthers), which was published in 1774.

The detail of Emilia Galotti'''s presence in the room, like many of the details of Werther'', was taken from the 1772 suicide of Goethe's acquaintance Karl Wilhelm Jerusalem.

References

External links

Emilia Galotti at Project Gutenberg (in English)
Emilia Galotti  at Project Gutenberg (in German) 

1772 plays
Plays by Gotthold Ephraim Lessing
Italy in fiction
German plays adapted into films
Tragedy plays